WSRW (1590 AM) is a radio station broadcasting a classic hits format. Licensed to Hillsboro, Ohio, United States, WSRW is branded as "WSRW 101.5," utilizing the frequency of their FM translator, W268CC (101.5 FM), also licensed to Hillsboro. WSRW, also known as The Highland Broadcasting Company, was owned and operated by Thomas and Susan Archibald for over 43 years, and eventually sold in 2000. The station is currently owned by iHeartMedia, Inc. and features programming  from their Premium Choice network and Premiere Radio Networks.

Prior to December 26, 2015, WSRW operated as a full-time simulcast of WCHO-FM as "Buckeye Country 105.5."

Willard Parr - then a sergeant with the Hillsboro police department - joined WSRW as it was still being built in January 1956, and was the first voice heard as the station began broadcasting that July 17.

Cleveland-area radio broadcaster Chuck Collier, a Hillsboro native, began his broadcast career at WSRW. Collier later voice-tracked for WSRW's previous classic country format before his death in October 2011.

References

External links

SRW
Radio stations established in 1956
1956 establishments in Ohio
IHeartMedia radio stations